Cowpe  is a hamlet in Rossendale, Lancashire, England. It lies in the South Pennines, north of Scout Moor Wind Farm, by the Pennine Bridleway. Rawtenstall is to the west, Bacup to the east and Waterfoot to the north. Directly south over Brandwood and Scout Moors, is Rochdale. 'Cowpe' is thought to derive from 'Cow Pastures'.

Cowpe is renowned for its scenery, as is the whole of the Rossendale valley, and houses farms supplying crops and livestock. The village has a Sunday School, and a park, designed by residents and opened in 2002 and a B & B (Tippet's Farm). Cowpe Reservoir is used by fishermen and has footpaths to the moors and is popular with walkers and mountain bikers.There is a Christmas tree farm, Lench House Farm.
The village's only public house, the Buck, was purchased and run down by property developers and closed in 2012 for conversion to private housing.

Cowpe has a mixture of terraced houses, cottages, farmhouses, renovated houses and semi detached. They include Cowpe Lodge, Asten Buildings (row of the Buck) Brooklands, Ivy Bank, The Linney, Daisy Bank, Springside, Spring Gardens, Co-operative Buildings, Crag View, Moor View, Bottoms Row, Holmes Cottages and Boarsgreave Lane. The village has been steadily growing over the last decade with many of the outlying derelict farms and barns being brought back into use.

Cowpe gained media attention when filming took place for the BBC1 television show Survivors, which used farms and gardens for filming.

A key landmark of Cowpe, the 19th century Kearn's Mill eventually closed in 2002 when repeated flash flooding caused problems maintaining business insurance. Following several changes of ownership due to problems with site contamination, access and bad weather.
It was demolished in 2015 to make way for a 22 property housing development by Skipton Properties.

It is part of the Rossendale and Darwen constituency, with Jake Berry having been the Member of Parliament since 2010.

References

External links

Hamlets in Lancashire
Geography of the Borough of Rossendale